The Swedish Armed Forces is the government agency that forms the armed forces of Sweden, tasked with the defense of the country as well as with promoting Sweden's wider interests, supporting international peacekeeping, and providing humanitarian aid. It consists of the Swedish Army, the Swedish Air Force and the Swedish Navy, as well as a military reserve force, the Home Guard. Since 1994, all Swedish military branches are organized within a single unified government agency, headed by the Supreme Commander, even though the individual services maintain their distinct identities.

The Swedish Armed Forces is made up of 23,600 active personnel, 11,200 military reserves, 24,000 Home Guard and 5,200 additional conscripts yearly into the Reserves (set to increase to 8,000 conscripts yearly by 2024) as of 2022.

Units of the Swedish Armed Forces are currently on deployment in several international operations either actively or as military observers, including Afghanistan as part of the Resolute Support Mission and in Kosovo (as part of Kosovo Force). Moreover, Swedish Armed Forces contribute as the leading state for a European Union Battlegroup approximately once every three years through the Nordic Battlegroup. Sweden has close relations with NATO and NATO members, and participates in training exercises like the Admiral Pitka Recon Challenge, and Exercise Trident Juncture 2018. Sweden also has a strong cooperation with its closest allies of the Nordic countries being part of the Nordic Defence Cooperation and joint exercises such as Exercise Northern Wind 2019.

Sweden has not participated in an officially declared war since the 1814 Swedish–Norwegian War, although its forces, under the UN flag, have been involved in conflicts like the Congo Crisis and the military intervention in Libya. The Swedish government has managed to keep Sweden out of war through a policy of neutrality.

Equipment

The Swedish army has 121 tanks (Leopard 2A5/Strv 122), roughly 1,300 APCs (Patria XA-360/203/180, RG-32 Scout), 800 IFVs (550 CV9040, 150 Bv410, 90 Bv308/309), 11,300 utility vehicles (ex. Bv206/208, MB G-Class 6x6 and 4x4, MB sprinter), 84 towed and 40 self-propelled mortar (12 cm grk m/41, grkpbv90) and 48 self-propelled artillery guns (Archer). It also consists of several different specialized vehicles.

The Swedish Navy has a total of 387 ships, including 4 submarines (3 Gotland, 1 Södermanland), 7 corvettes (5 Visby, 2 Gävle), 9 minesweepers (5 Koster, 4 Styrsö), 13 larger patrol boats (2 Stockholm and 11 Tapper) and 9 specialised ships with different support duties. The rest is made up of different smaller vessels such as the CB90.

Currently the Swedish Airforce has a total of 210 aircraft, 94 of those being JAS39C/D Gripen (60 JAS39E on order), 6 C130H Hercules (1 with aerial refueling capabilities), 4 SAAB 340 (2 AEW&C and 2 VIP transport), 4 Gulfstream IV (2 SIGINT and 2 VIP transport) as well as 15 UH-60 Blackhawk and 18 NH90 helicopters. The rest is made up of different transport and trainer aircraft.

History 

After a period of enhanced readiness during World War I, the Swedish Armed Forces were subject to severe downsizing during the interwar years. When World War II started, a large rearmament program was launched to once again guard Swedish neutrality, relying on mass male conscription to fill the ranks.

After World War II, Sweden considered building nuclear weapons to deter a Soviet invasion. From 1945 to 1972 the Swedish government ran a clandestine nuclear weapons program under the guise of civilian defence research at the Swedish National Defence Research Institute. By the late 1950s, the work had reached the point where underground testing was feasible. However, at that time the Riksdag prohibited research and development of nuclear weapons, pledging that research should be done only for the purpose of defence against nuclear attack. The option to continue development was abandoned in 1966, and Sweden subsequently signed the Non-Proliferation Treaty in 1968. The program was finally concluded in 1972.

During the Cold War, the wartime mass conscription system was kept in place to act as a deterrent to the Soviet Union, seen as the greatest military threat to Sweden. The end of the Cold War and the collapse of the Soviet Union meant that the perceived threat lessened and the armed forces were downsized, with conscription taking in fewer and fewer recruits until it was deactivated in 2010.

Sweden remains a neutral country, but has cooperated with NATO since the Partnership for Peace in 1994. Sweden was one of five partner nations granted the status of Enhanced Opportunities Partner at NATO's Wales Summit in 2014, coinciding with Russia's illegal annexation of Crimea and intervention in Ukraine.

The Russo-Georgian War of 2008 and the events in Ukraine in 2014 gradually shifted Swedish debate back in favour of increased defence spending, as concerns grew over Russia's military buildup and intentions. Conscription was reintroduced in 2017 to supplement the insufficient number of volunteers signing up for service. Unlike in the past, the current conscription system applies to both men and women.

Following the United Kingdom leaving the European Union in 2020, the EU's mutual defence clause (Lisbon Treaty Article 42.7) ceased to apply to the UK. In 2022, Sweden and the UK signed a mutual security deal, re-pledging support if either state is attacked.

On June 29th, 2022, Sweden along with Finland was formally invited to become a member of NATO.

Doctrine 

The Swedish Armed Forces have four main tasks:
 To assert the territorial integrity of Sweden.
 To defend the country if attacked by a foreign nation.
 To support the civil community in case of disasters (e.g. flooding).
 To deploy forces to international peace support operations.

Sweden aims to have the option of remaining neutral in case of proximate war. However, Sweden cooperates militarily with a number of foreign countries. As a member state of the European Union, Sweden is acting as the leading state for EU Battlegroups and also has a close cooperation, including joint exercises, with NATO through its membership in Partnership for Peace and Euro-Atlantic Partnership Council. In 2008 a partnership was initiated between the Nordic countries to, among other things, increase the capability of joint action, and this led to the creation of the Nordic Defence Cooperation (NORDEFCO). As a response to the expanded military cooperation the defence proposition of 2009 stated that Sweden will not remain passive if a Nordic country or a member state of the European Union were attacked.

Recent political decisions have strongly emphasized the capability to participate in international operations, to the point where this has become the main short-term goal of training and equipment acquisition. However, after the 2008 South Ossetia war territorial defense was once again emphasized. Until then most units could not be mobilized within one year. In 2009 the Minister for Defence stated that in the future all of the armed forces must be capable of fully mobilizing within one week.

In 2013, after Russian air exercises in close proximity to the Swedish border were widely reported, only six percent of Swedes expressed confidence in the ability of the nation to defend itself.

Organization 

The Supreme Commander (ÖB) is a four-star general or flag officer who is the agency head of the Swedish Armed Forces and the highest ranking professional officer on active duty. The Supreme Commander reports, normally through the Minister of Defence, to the Government of Sweden, which in turn answers to the Riksdag. The current supreme commander is General Micael Bydén.

Before the enactment of the 1974 Instrument of Government, the King of Sweden was the de jure commander in chief. Since then, King Carl XVI Gustaf is still considered to hold the honorary ranks of general and admiral à la suite, but the role is entirely ceremonial.

The Swedish Armed Forces consists of three service branches; the Army, the Air Force and the Navy, with addition of the military reserve force Home Guard. Since 1994, the first three service branches are organized within a single unified government agency, headed by the Supreme Commander, while the Home Guard reports directly to the Supreme Commander. However, the services maintain their separate identities through the use of different uniforms, ranks, and other service specific traditions.

Armed Forces Headquarters 
The Swedish Armed Forces Headquarters is the highest level of command in the Swedish Armed Forces. It is led by the Supreme Commander with a civilian Director General as his deputy, with functional directorates having different responsibilities (e.g. the Military Intelligence and Security Service). Overall, the Armed Forces Headquarters has about 2,100 employees, including civilian personnel.

Schools 
Some of the schools listed below answer to other units, listed under the various branches of the Armed Forces:

Artillery Combat School (ArtSS) located in Boden
Armed Forces Technical School (FMTS) located in Halmstad
Air Warfare Centre (LSS) located in Uppsala
Armed Forces Interpreter/Interrogator School (TolkS) located in Uppsala
Swedish Defence University (FHS) located in Stockholm
Field Work School (FarbS) located in Eksjö
Air Force Air Officer School (FBS) located in Uppsala
Swedish Parachute Ranger School (FJS) located in Karlsborg
Flight School (FlygS) located in Linköping/Malmen
Helicopter Combat School (HkpSS) located in Linköping/Malmen
National Home Guard Combat School (HvSS) located in Södertälje
Command School (LedS) located in Enköping
Anti-Aircraft Combat School (LvSS) located in Halmstad
Military Academy Halmstad (MHS H) located in Halmstad
Military Academy Karlberg (MHS K) located in Stockholm/Karlberg
Land Warfare Centre (MSS) located in Skövde also a detachment in Kvarn
Swedish Naval Warfare Centre (SSS) located in Karlskrona and Stockholm/Berga

Centres 
Swedish Armed Forces Centre for Defence Medicine (FömedC) located in Gothenburg, with a section in Linköping
Swedish Armed Forces Logistics (FMLOG) located in Stockholm, Boden, Karlskrona and Arboga
Armed Forces Intelligence and Security Centre (FMUndSäkC) located in Uppsala
Armed Forces Musical Centre (FöMusC) located in Stockholm/Kungsängen
Recruitment Centre (RekryC) located in Stockholm
National CBRN Defence Centre (SkyddC) located in Umeå
Swedish EOD and Demining Centre (SWEDEC) located in Eksjö
Swedish Armed Forces International Center (Swedint) located in Stockholm/Kungsängen

Nordic Battlegroup 
The Nordic Battlegroup is a cooperative formation of the Swedish Armed Forces alongside mainly the other Nordic countries but also some of the Baltic countries as well as Ireland, tasked as one of the EU Battlegroups. The headquarter garrison for this group is currently situated in Enköping, Sweden.

International deployments
Sweden had military forces deployed in Afghanistan with the NATO-led Resolute Support Mission. Swedish forces were part of the previous International Security Assistance Force (2002–2014) in Afghanistan. Sweden is also part of the multinational Kosovo Force and has a naval force deployed to the gulf of Aden as a part of Operation Atalanta. Military observers from Sweden have been sent to a large number of countries, including Georgia, Lebanon, Israel and Sri Lanka and Sweden also participates with staff officers to missions in Sudan and Chad. Sweden has been one of the Peacekeeping nations of the Neutral Nations Supervisory Commission that is tasked with overseeing the truce in the Korean Demilitarized Zone since the Korean war ended in 1953.

Past deployments
A battalion and other units were deployed with the NATO-led peacekeeping SFOR in Bosnia and Herzegovina (1996–2000), following the Bosnian War. NORDBAT 2 has been studied as an example of mission command on a chaotic battlefield with conflicting national orders.

Swedish air and ground forces saw combat during the Congo Crisis, as part of the United Nations Operation in the Congo force. 9 army battalions were sent in all, and their mission lasted 1960–1964.

Personnel

From national service to an all-volunteer force 
In mid-1995, with the national service system based on universal military training, the Swedish Army consisted of 15 maneuver brigades and, in addition, 100 battalions of various sorts (artillery, engineers, rangers, air defense, amphibious, security, surveillance etc.) with a mobilization-time of between one and two days. When national service was replaced by a selective service system, fewer and fewer young men were drafted due to the reduction in size of the armed forces. By 2010 the Swedish Army had two battalions that could be mobilized within 90 days. When the volunteer system had been fully implemented by 2019, the army consisted of 7 maneuver battalions and 14 battalions of various sorts with a readiness of one week. The Home Guard was reduced in size to 22,000 soldiers. In 2019 the Swedish Armed Forces, now with a restored national service system combined with volunteer forces, aimed to reach 3 brigades as maneuver units by 2025.

Re-implementing conscription 
After having ended the universal male conscription system in 2010, as well as deactivating conscription in peacetime, the conscription system was re-activated in 2017. Since 2018 both women and men are conscripted on equal terms. The motivation behind reactivating conscription was the need for personnel, as volunteer numbers proved to be insufficient to maintain the armed forces.

The Swedish defence forces are currently, educating 5,000-6,000 conscripts per year. However, after the Russian invasion of Ukraine, the defence forces stated that there is a need for significantly more than the current. By december 2022, it was announced to increase the yearly conscripted to 10,000 by the end of 2035. In addition, figures from 2022, show that 79% of Swedes support in some form, an increase in the number of people who are conscripted. 47% of the respondents said that the majority of 19/20 year-olds should perform conscription.

Personnel structure 

Military personnel of the Swedish Armed Forces consists of:

Officer OFF/K – Regular continuously serving officers (OF1-OF9).
Officer OFF/T – Reserve part-time officers (OF1-OF3).
Specialistofficer SO/K – Regular continuously serving NCO (OR6-OR9).
Specialistofficer SO/T – Reserve part-time serving NCO (OR6-OR7). 
GSS/K – Regular continuously serving enlisted (OR1-OR5). 
GSS/T – Reserve part-time serving enlisted (OR1-OR5).
GSS/P – Personnel in wartime placement (OR1-OR5).

K = Continuously

T = Part-time

P = Conscript, for personnel drafted under the Swedish law of comprehensive defense duty

Planned size of the Swedish Armed Forces 2011–2020 

Annual recruitment of GSS is assumed to be about 4,000 persons.

Source:

Criticism and research 
In 2008, professor Mats Alvesson of the University of Lund and Karl Ydén of the University of Göteborg claimed in an op-ed, based on Ydén's doctoral dissertation, that a large part of the officer corps of the Swedish Armed Forces was preoccupied with administrative tasks instead of training soldiers or partaking in international operations. They claimed that Swedish officers were mainly focused on climbing the ranks and thereby increasing their wages and that the main way of doing this is to take more training courses, which decreases the number of officers that are specialized in their field. Therefore, the authors claimed, the Swedish Armed Forces was poorly prepared for its mission. Major changes have been made to the officer system since then.

The transformation of the old invasion defence-oriented armed forces to the new smaller and more mobile force has also been criticized. According to the Supreme Commander of the Swedish Armed Forces the present defence budget will not be enough to implement the new defence structure by 2019. And that even when finished the armed forces will only be able to fight for a week at most.

During 2013 several Russian Air Force exercises over the Baltic Sea aimed at Swedish military targets have made 
the future of the Swedish Armed Forces a hot topic and several political parties now want to increase defense funding. In August 2019, the government announced a bank tax to fund the military spending.

Ranks

When an army based on national service (conscription) was introduced in 1901 all commissioned officers had ranks that were senior of the warrant officers (underofficerare) and non-commissioned officers (underbefäl). In a reform 1926 the relative rank of the then senior warrant officer, fanjunkare, was increased to be equal with the junior officer rank underlöjtnant and above the most junior officer rank fänrik. In 1960 the relative rank of the warrant officers were elevated further so that

i. The lowest warrant officer, sergeant, had relative rank just below the lowest officer rank, fänrik.
ii. The second warrant officer rank, fanjunkare, had relative rank between fänrik and löjtnant
iii. The highest warrant officer rank, förvaltare, had relative rank between first lieutenant and captain.

In 1972 the personnel structure changed, reflecting increased responsibilities of warrant and non-commissioned officers, renaming the underofficerare as kompaniofficerare, giving them the same ranks as company grade officers (fänrik, löjtnant, kapten). Underbefäl was renamed plutonsofficerare and given the rank titles of sergeant and fanjunkare, although their relative rank were now placed below fänrik. The commissioned officers were renamed regementsofficerare, beginning with löjtnant. The three-track career system was maintained, as well as three separate messes.

A major change in the personnel structure in 1983 (NBO 1983), merged the three professional corps of platoon officers, company officers, and regimental officers into a one-track career system within a single corps called professional officers (yrkesofficerare). The three messes were also merged to one.

In 2008 the Riksdag decided to create a two-track career system with a category called specialistofficerare. When implementing the parliamentary resolution the Supreme Commander decided that some ranks in this category should, like the old underofficerare ranks in 1960–1972, have a relative rank higher than the most junior officers.

Other government agencies reporting to the Ministry of Defence 

Swedish Defence Materiel Administration, or Försvarets materielverk (FMV)
Swedish National Service Administration, or Plikt- och prövningsverket
Swedish Defence University, or Försvarshögskolan
Swedish National Defence Radio Establishment, or Försvarets radioanstalt (FRA)
Swedish Defence Research Agency, or Totalförsvarets forskningsinstitut (FOI)
Swedish Civil Contingencies Agency, or Myndigheten för samhällsskydd och beredskap

Voluntary defence organizations 
Home Guard
Swedish Women's Voluntary Defence Organization ("Lottorna")

See also 
Society and Defence
Scandinavian defence union
Gotland National Conscription
Origins of Swedish conscription system
Per Albin Line
Military on Gotland
Swedish Fortifications Agency
Swedish National Inspectorate of Strategic Products
List of wars involving Sweden
List of Swedish military commanders
List of Swedish monarchs
List of Swedish regiments
List of military aircraft of Sweden
List of Swedish military calibers

References 

Manpower-numbers are taken from

External links
 

Defence agencies of Sweden
Armed Forces
 
Permanent Structured Cooperation